Valentin Petry (5 May 1928 – 25 May 2016) was a German racing cyclist. He won the German National Road Race in 1956.

References

External links
 

1928 births
2016 deaths
German male cyclists
Cyclists from Hesse
German cycling road race champions
People from Main-Taunus-Kreis
Sportspeople from Darmstadt (region)
20th-century German people